The Lingerie Basketball League (LBL) was a women's basketball league, created in 2011. The Lingerie Basketball League was set up after the success of the Legends Football League, originally called the Lingerie Football League. Like the LFL, players in the LBL wear revealing outfits instead of traditional uniforms.

The Lingerie Basketball League held its inaugural season in 2011 with four Los Angeles based teams. The L.A. Beauties won the first championship.

The LBL held a second season in 2012, but there was no championship game. A championship game between the L.A. Divas and L.A. Glam was announced, but never held.

The LBL did not play in 2013 and is currently inactive.

Teams

See also
Bikini Basketball Association
Legends Football League
Foxy boxing

References

Lingerie
Defunct women's basketball leagues in the United States
Sports leagues established in 2011
2011 establishments in California
Sports entertainment
2013 disestablishments in California
Sports leagues disestablished in 2013